Angelo Giovanni Mauro Binaschi (15 January 1889 – 15 March 1973) was an Italian professional footballer who played as a defender.

At club level, he played for U.S. Pro Vercelli Calcio for 11 seasons, winning the Italian league championship 5 times (1909, 1910, 1911, 1913 and 1921). He made his international debut for the Italy national football team on 6 January 1911 in a game against Hungary.

He represented Italy at the 1912 Summer Olympics.

Honours

Player
Pro Vercelli
Italian Football Championship: 1908, 1909, 1910–11, 1911–12, 1912–13, 1920–21

References

External links
 

1889 births
1973 deaths
Italian footballers
Italy international footballers
F.C. Pro Vercelli 1892 players
Serie A players
Olympic footballers of Italy
Footballers at the 1912 Summer Olympics
Association football defenders